The 2017–18 Vanderbilt Commodores men's basketball team represented Vanderbilt University in the 2017–18 NCAA Division I men's basketball season. They were coached by Bryce Drew, who was in his second season at Vanderbilt. The Commodores played their home games at Memorial Gymnasium in Nashville, Tennessee as members of the Southeastern Conference. They finished the season 12–20, 6–12 in SEC play to finish in 13th place. They lost in the first round of the SEC tournament to Georgia.

Previous season
The Commodores finished the 2016–17 season 19–16, 10–8 in SEC play to finish in a three-way tie for fifth place. They defeated Texas A&M and Florida in the SEC tournament before losing in the semifinals to Arkansas. They received an at-large invitation to the NCAA tournament as a #9 seed in the Midwest Region, despite having the most losses, 15, of any at-large recipient, where they lost in the first round to #8 Northwestern.

Offseason

Departures

Incoming transfers

2017 recruiting class

2018 Recruiting class

Roster

Schedule and results

|-
!colspan=9 style=| Regular season

|-
!colspan=9 style=| SEC tournament

See also
 2017–18 Vanderbilt Commodores women's basketball team

References

Vanderbilt
Vanderbilt Commodores basketball
2018 in sports in Tennessee
Vanderbilt Commodores men's basketball seasons